Martin Slanar and Simone Vagnozzi defeated 6–3, 6–4  Andre Begemann and Dustin Brown in the final.

Seeds

Draw

Draw

References
 Main Draw

Palm Hills International Tennis Challenger - Doubles